Moos in Passeier is a comune (municipality) in the Passeier Valley.

Geography

The word Moos means bog or wetland in Austro-Bavarian dialects of German.

Moos in Passeier borders the following municipalities: Partschins, Ratschings, Riffian, St. Leonhard in Passeier, St. Martin in Passeier, Schnals, Tirol and Sölden (in Austria).

History

Coat-of-arms
The emblem represents three argent and sharp peaks, silhouetted against the azure sky and the vert grass, which symbolizes the position of the municipality. The coat of arms was granted in 1967.

Society

Linguistic distribution
According to the 2011 census, 99.58% of the population speak German, 0.33% Italian and 0.09% Ladin as first language.

Demographic evolution

References

External links

 Homepage of the municipality

Municipalities of South Tyrol